Circuit rider may refer to:

 Circuit rider (water/wastewater), a position in the rural water industry 
 Circuit rider (religious), a position within the Methodist Church and related denominations
 The Circuit Rider, a sculpture of a religious circuit rider in Oregon, USA
 Circuit riding, the practice of a jurist travelling between locations
 Circuit rider (technology), a traveling technology consultants (sometimes referred to as a eRider)
 Circuit Rider (album), a 2014 album by Ron Miles